Guillaume Deschamps (born 23 November 1978) is a French former footballer who played as a striker.

External links
 
 

1978 births
Living people
Footballers from Marseille
French footballers
Association football forwards
Olympique de Marseille players
Gazélec Ajaccio players
LB Châteauroux players
CS Sedan Ardennes players
Chamois Niortais F.C. players
Stade Lavallois players
1. FC Saarbrücken players
Grenoble Foot 38 players
Athlético Marseille players
Toulouse Fontaines Club players
Ligue 1 players
Ligue 2 players
French expatriate footballers
Expatriate footballers in Germany